Rakhee Tandon (born Rakhi Vijan) is an Indian actress best known for her role of Sweety Mathur in the popular Indian classic sitcom Hum Paanch. Her first acting credit is from the sitcom Dekh Bhai Dekh. Tandon also acted in a television movie Humko Ishq Ne Mara in 1997, as well as in Golmaal Returns as Anthony Gonsalves' wife. Currently, she is starring in the StarPlus TV show Faltu. She was a contestant on the Indian reality show Big Boss in the second season in 2008 but could not survive in the house for long and got evicted in the second week (Day 13)

Tandon was married to Rajiv Tandon, brother of actress Raveena Tandon.

Filmography 
 Krrish 3 as Sharma's wife
 Money Hai Toh Honey Hai as Mukti Kapoor
 Golmaal Returns as Julie Gonsalves
 Thank you as King's wife
 Sadiyaan
 Humko Ishq Ne Mara

Television

References 

Indian television actresses
Indian women comedians
Living people
Year of birth missing (living people)
Bigg Boss (Hindi TV series) contestants